In calculus, the squeeze theorem (also known as the sandwich theorem, among other names) is a theorem regarding the limit of a function that is trapped between two other functions.

The squeeze theorem is used in calculus and mathematical analysis, typically to confirm the limit of a function via comparison with two other functions whose limits are known. It was first used geometrically by the mathematicians Archimedes and Eudoxus in an effort to compute , and was formulated in modern terms by Carl Friedrich Gauss.

In many languages (e.g. French, German, Italian, Hungarian and Russian), the squeeze theorem is also known as the two officers (and a drunk) theorem, or some variation thereof.  The story is that if two police officers are escorting a drunk prisoner between them, and both officers go to a cell, then (regardless of the path taken, and the fact that the prisoner may be wobbling about between the officers) the prisoner must also end up in the cell.

Statement 
The squeeze theorem is formally stated as follows.

This theorem is also valid for sequences.

Proof
According to the above hypotheses we have, taking the limit inferior and superior:

so all the inequalities are indeed equalities, and the thesis immediately follows.

Symbolically,

As

means that

and 

means that

then we have

We can choose .

which completes the proof. Q.E.D

The proof for sequences is very similar, using the -definition of the limit of a sequence.

Examples

First example 

The limit

cannot be determined through the limit law

because

does not exist.

However, by the definition of the sine function,

It follows that

Since , by the squeeze theorem,  must also be 0.

Second example 

Probably the best-known examples of finding a limit by squeezing are the proofs of the equalities

The first limit follows by means of the squeeze theorem from the fact that

for x close enough to 0. The correctness of which for positive x can be seen by simple geometric reasoning (see drawing) that can be extended to negative x as well. The second limit follows from the squeeze theorem and the fact that

for x close enough to 0.

These two limits are used in proofs of the fact that the derivative of the sine function is the cosine function.  That fact is relied on in other proofs of derivatives of trigonometric functions.

Third example 

It is possible to show that

by squeezing, as follows.

In the illustration at right, the area of the smaller of the two shaded sectors of the circle is

since the radius is sec θ and the arc on the unit circle has length Δθ.  Similarly, the area of the larger of the two shaded sectors is

What is squeezed between them is the triangle whose base is the vertical segment whose endpoints are the two dots. The length of the base of the triangle is tan(θ + Δθ) − tan(θ), and the height is 1. The area of the triangle is therefore

From the inequalities

we deduce that

provided Δθ > 0, and the inequalities are reversed if Δθ < 0.  Since the first and third expressions approach sec2θ as Δθ → 0, and the middle expression approaches  tan θ, the desired result follows.

Fourth example 

The squeeze theorem can still be used in multivariable calculus but the lower (and upper functions) must be below (and above) the target function not just along a path but around the entire neighborhood of the point of interest and it only works if the function really does have a limit there. It can, therefore, be used to prove that a function has a limit at a point, but it can never be used to prove that a function does not have a limit at a point.

cannot be found by taking any number of limits along paths that pass through the point, but since

therefore, by the squeeze theorem,

References

Notes

References

External links 
 
 Squeeze Theorem by Bruce Atwood (Beloit College) after work by, Selwyn Hollis (Armstrong Atlantic State University), the Wolfram Demonstrations Project.
 Squeeze Theorem on ProofWiki.

Limits (mathematics)
Functions and mappings
Articles containing proofs
Theorems in calculus
Theorems in real analysis